Crisularia is a genus of bryozoans belonging to the family Bugulidae.

The genus has almost cosmopolitan distribution.

Species:

Crisularia aperta 
Crisularia bengalensis 
Crisularia bowiei 
Crisularia cucullata 
Crisularia cucullifera 
Crisularia cuspidata 
Crisularia dispar 
Crisularia gracilis 
Crisularia grayi 
Crisularia guara 
Crisularia harmsworthi 
Crisularia hyadesi 
Crisularia marcusi 
Crisularia microoecia 
Crisularia mollis 
Crisularia nana 
Crisularia pacifica 
Crisularia plumosa 
Crisularia prenanti 
Crisularia purpurotincta 
Crisularia rylandi 
Crisularia serrata 
Crisularia turrita

References

Bryozoan genera